The Atlantid race or North-Atlantid is a term historically used as one of the sub-races of the Caucasoid race. The term was popular in the early 20th century.

History
In his Die Mediterranen in Wales (1935), Egon Freiherr von Eickstedt coined the term "Atlantid" to denote a phenotype he stated was common in the British Isles. According to Bertil Lundman, it is synonymous with Joseph Deniker's earlier postulated "North-Occidental" or "North-Western" race, and also Czekanowski's "Northern-Western" subracial taxonomy. In the 1940s Lundman adopted the term "North-Atlantid" to cover these earlier terminologies, and further popularised it in The Races and Peoples of Europe (1977).

Physical appearance
The Atlantid or North-Atlantid, as described by Eickstedt and Lundman, is recognised as having a pigmentation between the Nordic and Atlanto-Mediterranid stock of the Mediterranean. While the pigmentation of the eyes is light, the hair in contrast is brown. The Atlantid is essentially a "Nordic-Mediterranean" blend, a term appearing in the literature of Earnest Hooton, but can differ in its exact gradient of pigmentation. Although usually recognised as intermediate between Nordic and Mediterranean, Deniker discussed what he saw occasionally as stronger Nordic or Mediterranean gradients.

Geography and origin
Lundman notes that the North-Atlantid phenotype is mainly found across British Isles, but also in some other North Sea coastal areas. There are two theories on the origin of the Atlantid phenotype, according to Lundman's theory the North-Atlantid came about through only a partial northern depigmentation:

References

Sources
 Joseph Deniker, The Races of Man, W. Scott, 1913 (reprint).
 Bertil Lundman, Jordens Människoraser och Folkstammar, Kärntryck, Åstorp, 1943.
 Bertil Lundman, Nutidens Människoraser, Uppsala, 1946.
 Bertil Lundman, The races and peoples of Europe, IAAEE, 1977.

Historical definitions of race